The Petrie multiplier is a thought experiment
or mathematical model
invented by British computer scientist Karen Petrie, and first described by Ian Gent in 2013.
The multiplier "shows that if the percentage of men and women in the room who make questionable remarks to the other sex is equal, then the average number of sexist remarks experienced by members of one party scales by the square of the proportion of one party to the other.

Mathematical formulation

Gent defined the multiplier in the following terms:

The Petrie multiplier corresponds to Lanchester's square law in battle and predator–prey dynamics.

Expanded model

The model assumes that men and women are equally sexist. Further, each sexist remark made by a man is assumed to randomly target one of the women and vice versa. A more complex analysis published in the Journal of Physics A modeled heterogeneous levels of sexism by assuming each person to make sexist remarks according to an independent Poisson process, maintaining the assumption that each sexist remark is directed to an individual of the opposite sex. Under these conditions the Petrie multiplier takes the form .

The Petrie multiplier has not been the subject of any empirical study.
However, one commentator used a Monte Carlo simulation to eliminate the assumption that people have a fixed number of sexist remarks to make, and found that women suffer from overwhelmingly more sexism in an environment where both genders are equally sexist.
Another probabilistic analysis found that the multiplier seemed to hold and suggested that the disparity could be even worse than quadratic.

References

Sexism
Women in computing
Thought experiments in ethics